The Zafarnama (lit. Book of Victory) is a biography of Timur written by the historian Nizam al-Din Shami. It served as the basis for a later and better-known Zafarnama by Sharaf ad-Din Ali Yazdi.

One translation by Felix Tauer was published in Prague in 1937.

References

Persian-language books
Iranian books
Timur
Biographical works